Eastern Shadows started out in 2009 as a film and music transmedia project. Founded by Nimal J (Fujii) in LA the project is now based out of Paramount Studios in Hollywood, CA, Fujii also toured as live band under the same name but other projects have taken precedence and the band is retired. Now focussed on Virtual Reality media production Eastern Shadows has partnered with Arizona State University to develop content for their Baseball and Football programs. As ASU Sun Devil Athletics supporters they are working to use available VR technology and apply it to training and entertainment products based around Sun Devil activities.

History

Formation
Initially formed to create the soundtrack for the film series of the same name, Eastern Shadows developed into a full-fledged band late in 2009.  The initial incarnation of the band appeared on stage at the final Rockit Hong Kong Music Festival, where the band was billed as Spencer Douglass.  However it was not until the band moved to the US that they really became serious and started working with the leading lights of the music scene. Their first EP was recorded by Steve Albini, and several of the resulting tracks are available on Soundcloud. A short tour of Asia followed in 2010.

The studio line-up in 2012 was N.Ronin vox/guitar, Solomon Walker on bass and Mike Fasano on drums. They in 2011 the project worked with Grammy winning producer Joe McGrath on their first releases at McGrath's studio Mod-o-phonic in Hollywood. They relocated to their own Joshua Tree studio to complete the work.

However events overtook the project and the opportunity to work in Japan saw the prospect of live work recede. Following successful shoots in Shinjuku, Tokyo district with scenes shot in Kabukichō, Tokyo several transmedia products were developed using sound tracks developed for the studio project.

Excited by the burgeoning of Virtual Reality hardware but frustrated at the lack of content in 2015 the Eastern Shadows project began to develop their own content. With shoots in Tokyo with Dead Sara and joined by Spanish producer Salva Bellesteros the results of the shoot were composited into a demo production that secured the partnership with ASU.

References

Transmediation